A hook turn (Australian English) or two-stage turn (British English), also known as a Copenhagen Left (in reference to cyclists specifically), is a road cycling manoeuvre or a motor vehicle traffic-control mechanism in which vehicles that would normally turn from the innermost lane of an intersection instead turn from the outermost lane, across all other lanes of traffic.

Hook turns are commonly used by cyclists as a safer alternative to merging with motor vehicles, or having to cross multiple lanes of traffic to reach a turning lane.

The legal use of hook turns by motor vehicles is relatively rare, but has been implemented in some jurisdictions (notably Melbourne, Australia) to keep the centre of a road free from congestion for use by light rail transit such as trams or other dedicated road services.

History
Hook turns were originally the standard right turn in Australia. Various jurisdictions phased them out at different times. Sydney and Newcastle changed to centre turns in 1939. South Australia discontinued the hook turn on 30 November 1950. Victoria changed to centre turns in 1954 for all right turns except at some intersections in the Melbourne CBD, where hook turns were retained to maintain a clearway in the centre of the road for the city's trams. Requiring vehicles to turn from the far lane, rather than the middle of the road, avoided conflicts between vehicles and trams without the need for extra traffic lanes or altered signals.

Method
To perform a two-stage turn, cyclists should enter the junction when given a green signal (simultaneous with motor traffic, though nearside turning traffic may be held at a red light). The farside-turning cyclist should pull into the nearside in front of the pedestrian crossing (in a marked waiting area, if available). When the side road is given a green signal, cyclists should proceed first by going straight ahead, completing their turn.

Usage by country
Hook turns have been implemented in number of other jurisdictions, including Illinois, Beijing, Japan, Taiwan, Germany, Denmark, the Netherlands, and other States of Australia.

Australia 

The Australian Road Rules set out the procedure for performing a hook turn in Australia, as well as other jurisdictions with left-hand traffic. In jurisdictions with right-hand traffic the lane of the turning vehicle is reversed.

When the traffic light is green, the turning vehicle approaches and enters the intersection from as near as possible to the left. If there is insufficient room then it must wait for the next cycle of the lights.
The vehicle moves forward, keeping clear of any marked foot crossing, until it is as near as possible to parallel with the left-most lane of the road the vehicle is entering.
The vehicle remains at this position until the traffic lights on the road it is entering change to green.
The vehicle then turns right into the road and continues straight ahead.
In many jurisdictions, lightweight vehicles, such as bicycles and mopeds, may make hook turns at any intersection regardless of signage. For instance, under the Australian Road Rules cyclists may legally perform a hook turn at any intersection unless otherwise signed.

Canada 

Toronto and Montreal have bicycle facilities that allow cyclists to perform perimiter-style turns, as such turns are known in Canada.

Denmark 
In Denmark, a hook turn is mandatory for cyclists.

United Kingdom 
Two-stage turn arrangements enable cyclists to turn right (across oncoming traffic) without needing to move to the centre of the carriageway. A two-stage turn is considered acceptable in LTN 1/20, England and Northern Ireland's cycle infrastructure design guide, and in Scotland's Cycling by Design guidance. 

A blue (informatory) sign can be placed to advise cyclists a two-stage turn is possible, and appropriate markings in front of the nearside approach lane. Furthermore, with authorisation by national governments, signs can be added to traffic lights to ban right turns for cyclists, unless completed in two stages.

Benefits 
There have been limited proposals for hook turns to be implemented as a more widespread replacement for conventional intersection turns. Computer modelling has indicated that hook turns have the potential to significantly reduce delays and congestion in most situations, especially where overall traffic flow is high.

On average, a tram will save 11-16 seconds when going through an intersection that uses hook turns.

Limitations 
Two-stage turns are often considered less preferable for cyclist safety than protected junctions, as there is more cyclist-pedestrian conflict.

See also 
 Protected intersection

References

External links 

 "Performing a Hook Turn" (VicRoads Guide)

Trams in Melbourne
Traffic law
Road junction types